Franklin D. Myers (born January 4, 1956) is a former American football offensive tackle who played in the National Football League (NFL) for the Minnesota Vikings. Born in San Bernardino, California, he attended Central High School in San Angelo, Texas. He played college football for Texas A&M, and was drafted in the fifth round of the 1978 NFL Draft by the Baltimore Colts with the 117th overall pick. Before the start of the 1978 season, he joined the Vikings, and played 12 times in his rookie year (11 starts). He played 14 times the following year, but did not start any games. His only statistical contribution in his two years in the league was a fumble recovery in a 34–10 playoff defeat against the Los Angeles Rams.

In 2007, Myers sued the Minnesota Vikings for loss of earnings relating to the treatment of injuries to his right hand and left wrist that caused him to suffer from Dupuytren's contracture and diminished his ability to work.

References

External links
Profile at Pro-Football-Reference.com

1956 births
Living people
Sportspeople from San Bernardino, California
American football offensive tackles
Texas A&M Aggies football players
Baltimore Colts players
Minnesota Vikings players